Kheyrabad (also Romanized as Kheyrābād and Khairābād) is a village in Eshen Rural District, Mehrdasht District, Najafabad County, Isfahan Province, Iran. At the 2006 census, its population was 750, in 196 families.

References 

Populated places in Najafabad County